Telefol, Telefomin, or Telefolmin may refer to:
 Telefol people
 Telefol language

See also
 Telefomin
 Telefomin District